Thomas Anthony Mehelich (August 4, 1906 – May 20, 1972) was an American football player. He played professional football in the National Football League (NFL) as a guard for the Minneapolis Red Jackets. He appeared in eight NFL games, four as a starter, during the 1929 season. After retiring from football, he operated a tavern in Coleraine, Minnesota.

References

1906 births
1972 deaths
Minneapolis Red Jackets players
Players of American football from Minnesota